The position of the Eastern Orthodox Church regarding the Filioque controversy is defined by their interpretation of the Bible, and the teachings of the Church Fathers, creeds and definitions of the seven Ecumenical Councils, as well as the decisions of several particular councils of the Eastern Orthodox Church.

William La Due describes modern Eastern Orthodox theological scholarship as split between a group of scholars that hold to a "strict traditionalism going back to Photius" and other scholars that are "not so adamantly opposed (to the filioque)". Vladimir Lossky asserted that any notion of a double procession of the Holy Spirit from both the Father and the Son was incompatible with Orthodox theology.  Orthodox scholars who share Lossky's view include Dumitru Stăniloae, John Romanides and Michael Pomazansky.   Sergius Bulgakov, however, was of the opinion that the Filioque did not represent an insurmountable obstacle to reunion of the Eastern Orthodox and Roman Catholic churches.

The Eastern Orthodox interpretation of the Trinity is that the Holy Spirit originates, has his cause for existence or being (manner of existence) from the Father alone as "One God, One Father" and that the filioque confuses the theology as it was defined at the councils at both Nicea and Constantinople. The position that having the creed say "the Holy Spirit which proceeds from the Father and the Son", does not mean that the Holy Spirit now has two origins, is the position the West took at the Council of Florence, as the Council declared the Holy Spirit "has His essence and His subsistent being from the Father together with the Son, and proceeds from both eternally as from one principle and a single spiration.

Views of Eastern Orthodox saints

The addition of the Filioque to the Niceno-Constantinopolitan Creed has been condemned as heretical by many important Fathers and saints of the Eastern Orthodox Church, including Photios I of Constantinople, Gregory Palamas and Mark of Ephesus, sometimes referred to as the Three Pillars of Orthodoxy.  However, the statement 'The Holy Spirit proceeds from the Father and the Son' can be understood in an orthodox sense if it is clear from the context that 'procession from the Son' refers to the sending forth of the Spirit in time, not to an eternal, double procession within the Trinity Itself. Hence, Maximus the Confessor defended the Western use of the Filioque in a context other than that of the Niceno-Constantinipolitan Creed and "defended the Filioque as a legitimate variation of the Eastern formula that the Spirit proceeds from the Father through the Son" (Concordia Theological Quarterly, January-April 1995, p. 32, and cf. p. 40).

Hierotheos Vlachos, metropolitan of Nafpaktos, wrote that according to Eastern Orthodox tradition, Gregory of Nyssa composed the section about the Holy Spirit in the Second Ecumenical Council's Niceno-Constantinopolitan Creed of 381. Siecienski doubted that Gregory of Nyssa "would have accepted the filioque as it was later understood in the West, although he witnesses to the important truth (often ignored in the East) that there is an eternal, and not simply economic, relationship of the Spirit to the Son."

Eastern Orthodox theology

In Eastern Orthodoxy, theology starts with the Father hypostasis, not the essence of God, since the Father is the God of the Old Testament. The Father is the origin of all things and this is the basis and starting point of the Orthodox trinitarian teaching of one God in Father, one God, of the essence of the Father (as the uncreated comes from the Father as this is what the Father is). In Eastern Orthodox theology, God's uncreatedness or being or essence in Greek is called ousia. Jesus Christ is the Son (God Man) of the uncreated Father (God). The Holy Spirit is the Spirit of the uncreated Father (God).

 God has existences (hypostases) of being; this concept is translated as the word "person" in the West. Each hypostasis of God is a specific and unique existence of God. Each has the same essence (coming from the origin, without origin, Father (God) they are uncreated). Each specific quality that constitutes a hypostasis of God, is non-reductionist and not shared.

It is this immanence of the Trinity that was defined in the finalized Nicene Creed. The economy of God, as God expresses himself in reality (his energies) was not what the Creed addressed directly. Nor the specifics of God's interrelationships of his existences, is again not what is defined within the Nicene Creed. The attempt to use the Creed to explain God's energies by reducing God existences to mere energies (actualities, activities, potentials) could be perceived as the heresy of semi-modalism.

Theodoret's statement against Cyril
Theodoret, bishop of Cyrrhus in the Roman province of Euphratensis, refused to endorse the 431 deposition of Nestorius, archbishop of Constantinople, by the First Council of Ephesus. Theodoret accused Cyril of Alexandria of erroneously teaching that the Son has a role in the origin of the Holy Spirit. In fact, several statements by Cyril exist in which he fleetingly declares that the Holy Spirit issues from the Father and the Son (with similar statements that the Spirit issues from the Father through the Son) in an intra-Trinitarian relationship. Antony Maas wrote that what Theodoret denied was not the eternal procession of the Holy Spirit from the Father and the Son, but only the claim that the Holy Spirit was created by or through the Son. Photius's position that the Holy Spirit proceeds from the Father alone has been described as a restatement of Theodoret's. In spite of Theodoret's attack on him for saying "the Spirit has his existence either from the Son or through the Son", Cyril continued to use such formulae.

Under persistent urging by the Fathers of the Council of Chalcedon (451), Theodoret finally pronounced an anathema on Nestorius. He died in 457. Almost exactly one hundred years later, the Fifth Ecumenical Council (553) declared anathema anyone who would defend the writings of Theodoret against Saint Cyril and his Twelve Anathemas, the ninth of which Theodoret had attacked for what it said of the procession of the Holy Spirit. (See Three-Chapter Controversy). Theodoret is a saint in Eastern Orthodoxy, but he is called the excommunicated in Occidental Orthodoxy and the Roman Church. Cyril spoke of the matter of which Theodoret accused him as a misunderstanding. Cyril himself taught that the Latin teaching of the procession of the Holy Spirit from the Father and the Son appears to confuse the three hypostases of God with the common attributes of each hypostasis, and to the God's energetic manifestation in the world.

John Damascus
Before Photius, St John of Damascus wrote explicitly of the relationship of the Holy Spirit to the Father and Son.

John of Damascus' position stated that the procession of the Holy Spirit is from the Father alone, but through the Son as mediator, in this way differing from Photius. John of Damascus along with Photius, never endorsed the Filioque in the Creed.

Photius and the Monarchy of the Father
Photius insisted on the expression "from the Father" and excluded "through the Son" (Christ as co-cause of the Holy Spirit rather than primary cause) with regard to the eternal procession of the Holy Spirit : "through the Son" applied only to the temporal mission of the Holy Spirit (the sending in time). Photius addresses in his entire work on the Filioque the Mystagogy of the Holy Spirit. That any addition to the Creed would be to complicate and confuse an already very clear and simple definition of the ontology of the Holy Spirit that the Ecumenical Councils already gave.

Photius' position has been called a reaffirmation of Orthodox doctrine of the Monarchy of the Father. Photius's position that the Holy Spirit proceeds from the Father alone has also been described as a restatement of the Cappadocian Antiochian school (as opposed to the Alexandrian) teaching of the "monarchy of the Father".

Of the Eastern Orthodox's teaching ("from the Father alone"), Vladimir Lossky says that, while "verbally it may seem novel", it expresses in its doctrinal tenor the traditional teaching which is considered Orthodox. The phrase "from the Father alone" arises from the fact that the Creed itself only has "from the Father". So that the word "alone", which Photius nor the Orthodox suggest be added to the Creed, has been called a "gloss on the Creed", a clarification, an explanation or interpretation of its meaning.

Photius as well as the Eastern Orthodox, have never seen the need, nor ever suggested the word "alone" be added to the Creed itself. With this, the Eastern Orthodox Church generally considers the added Filioque phrase "from the Father and the Son" to be heretical, and accordingly procession "from the Fatheralone" has been referred to as "a main dogma of the Greek Church". Avery Dulles does not go so far and only states that the procession of the Spirit from the Father alone was the formula preferred by Photius and his strict disciples.

Eastern Orthodox theologians maintain that by the expression "from the Father alone", and Photius' opposition to the Filioque, Photius was confirming what is Orthodox and consistent with church tradition. They draw the teaching of the Father as cause alone (their interpretation of the Monarchy of the Father) from such expressions from various saints and biblical text. Such as that of Saint Irenaeus, when he called the Word and the Spirit "the two hands of God". They interpret the phrase "monarchy of the Father" differently from those who see it as not in conflict with a procession of the Holy Spirit from the Father through or from the Son. As the Father has given to the Son everything that belongs to the Father, except being Father (see examples given above of those who in this way uphold the monarchy of the Father).

By insistence of the Filioque, Orthodox representatives say that the West appears to deny the monarchy of Father and the Father as principle origin of the Trinity. Which would indeed be the heresy of Modalism (which states the essence of God and not the Father is the origin of, the Father, Son and Holy Spirit). The idea of Photius having invented that the Father is sole source of cause of the Holy Trinity is to attribute to him something that predates Photius' existence i.e.Athanasius, Gregory Nazianzen, John Chrysostom, Theodore of Mopsuestia, Theodoret of Cyrus and John of Damascus. "Photius never explored the deeper meaning behind the formula 'through the Son', or the necessary eternal relationship between the Son and the Spirit, even though it was a traditional teaching of the previous Greek fathers," according to Siecienski.

Photius did recognize that the Spirit maybe said to proceed temporally through the Son or from the Son. Photius stated that this was not the eternal Trinitarian relationships that was actually the thing being defined in the Creed. The Nicene Creed in Greek, speaks of the procession of the Holy Spirit "from the Father", not "from the Father alone", nor "From the Father and the Son", nor "From the Father through the Son".

Photius taught this in light of the teachings from Saints like Irenaeus whose Monarchy of the Father is in contrast to subordinationism, as the Orthodox officially condemned subordinationism in the 2nd council of Constantinople. That the Monarchy of Father which is in the Nicene Creed, Photius (and the Eastern Orthodox) endorse as official doctrine.

Eastern Orthodox view of Roman Catholic theology

Eastern Orthodox theologians (e.g., Pomazansky) say that the Nicene Creed as a Symbol of Faith, as dogma, is to address and define church theology specifically the Orthodox Trinitarian understanding of God. In the hypostases of God as correctly expressed against the teachings considered outside the church. The Father hypostasis of the Nicene Creed is the origin of all. Eastern Orthodox theologians have stated that New Testament passages (often quoted by the Latins) speak of the economy rather than the ontology of the Holy Spirit, and that in order to resolve this conflict Western theologians made further doctrinal changes, including declaring all persons of the Trinity to originate in the essence of God (the heresy of Sabellianism). Eastern Orthodox theologians see this as teaching of philosophical speculation rather than from actual experience of God via theoria.

The Father is the eternal, infinite and uncreated reality, that the Christ and the Holy Spirit are also eternal, infinite and uncreated, in that their origin is not in the ousia of God, but that their origin is in the hypostasis of God called the Father. The double procession of the Holy Spirit bears some resemblance

The following are some Roman Catholic dogmatic declarations of the Filioque which are in contention with Eastern Orthodoxy:
 The Fourth Council of the Lateran (1215): "The Father is from no one, the Son from the Father only, and the Holy Spirit equally from both."
 The Second Council of Lyon, session 2 (1274): " the Holy Spirit proceeds eternally from Father and Son, not as from two principles, but as from one, not by two spirations, but by one only."
 The Council of Florence, session 6 in Laetentur Caeli (1439), on union with the Greeks: "We declare that when holy Doctors and Fathers say that the Holy Spirit proceeds from the Father through the Son, this tends toward that understanding which signifies that the Son, like the Father, is also what the Greeks call 'cause' and the Latins 'principle' of the subsistence of the Holy Spirit.And since the Father himself has given to his only begotten Son, in generating him, all that the Father has except being the Father, the Son himself eternally has from the Father, from whom he is eternally generated, precisely this: that the Holy Spirit proceeds from the Son."
 The Council of Florence, session 8 in (1439), on : "The Holy Spirit is eternally from Father and Son; He has his nature and subsistence at once (simul) from the Father and the Son. He proceeds eternally from both as from one principle and through one spiration. ... And, since the Father has through generation given to the only-begotten Son everything that belongs to the Father, except being Father, the Son has also eternally from the Father, from whom he is eternally born, that the Holy Spirit proceeds from the Son."
 The Council of Florence, session 11 (1442), in Cantate Domino, on union with the Copts and Ethiopians: "Father, Son and holy Spirit; one in essence, three in persons; unbegotten Father, Son begotten from the Father, holy Spirit proceeding from the Father and the Son;  the holy Spirit alone proceeds at once from the Father and the Son.  Whatever the holy Spirit is or has, he has from the Father together with the Son. But the Father and the Son are not two principles of the holy Spirit, but one principle, just as the Father and the Son and the holy Spirit are not three principles of creation but one principle."
 In particular the condemnation, made at the Second Council of Lyons, session 2 (1274), of those "who  deny that the Holy Spirit proceeds eternally from the Father and the Son or who  assert that the Holy Spirit proceeds from the Father and the Son as from two principles, not from one."

In the judgment of these Orthodox, the Roman Catholic Church is in fact teaching as a matter of Roman Catholic dogma that the Holy Spirit derives his origin and being (equally) from both the Father and the Son, making the Filioque a double procession. This being the very thing that Maximus the Confessor was stating in his work from the 7th century that would be wrong and that the West was not doing.

They perceive the West as teaching through more than one type of theological Filioque a different origin and cause of the Holy Spirit. That through the dogmatic Roman Catholic Filioque the Holy Spirit is subordinate to the Father and the Son and not a free and independent and equal to the Father, hypostasis that receives his uncreatedness from the origin of all things, the Father hypostasis. Trinity expresses the idea of message, messenger and revealer, or mind, word and meaning. Eastern Orthodox Christians believe in one God the Father, whose person is uncaused and unoriginate, who, because He is love and communion, always exists with His Word and Spirit.

Gregory Palamas' Tomus of 1351

In St Gregory of Palamas' Tomus (1351) on the issue of the Filioque he very clearly denotes the distinctions of the Eastern and Western churches positions on the procession of the Holy Spirit here St Gregory was not only following the Eastern Tradition of what was addressed in the Nicene Creed by the Greek Fathers but he also clarifies what the divergent phrases of those in the East who appear to support the Filioque and what distinction is actually being made by the Eastern fathers who oppose the use of Filioque.
"The Great Maximus, the holy Tarasius, and even the saintly John [Damascene] recognize that the Holy Spirit proceeds from the Father, from whom it subsists in terms of its hypostasis and the cause of its being. At the same time, they acknowledge that the Spirit is given, revealed, and, manifeste, comes forth, and is known through the Son."

Orthodox theologians who do not condemn the Filioque
Not all Orthodox theologians share the opinion of Lossky, Stăniloae, Romanides, and Pomazansky, who condemn the Filioque. There is a liberal view within the Orthodox tradition which is more accepting of the Filioque.  The Encyclopedia of Christian Theology mentions that Vasily Bolotov, Paul Evdokimov, I. Voronov and Bulgakov classify the Filioque as a Theologoumenon – a permissible theological opinion. Since a theologoumenon is a theological opinion on what is defined outside of dogma, in the case of any Orthodox theologians open to the filioque as opinion, it is unclear if they would accept that the filioque ever be added into the Creed for the whole church, or just something exclusive for the Latin language based church of the West. For Vasily Bolotov this is confirmed by other sources, even if they do not themselves adopt that opinion.
Though Bolotov firmly rejects the Filioque in the procession of the Spirit from the Father.

Bulgakov wrote, in The Comforter, that:

As an Orthodox theologian, Bulgakov acknowledged that dogma can only established by an ecumenical council.

Boris Bobrinskoy sees the Filioque as having positive theological content. Ware suggests that the problem is of semantics rather than of basic doctrinal differences. Saint Theophylact of Ohrid likewise held that the difference was linguistic in nature and not actually theological.

Notes

References

Sources

 
  
  Previously accessed via 
 
 
 
 
 
 
 
 
  Chapter was first published in 
 
 
 
 
  Also archived as from scoba.us. New York: Standing Conference of Canonical Orthodox Bishops in the Americas.
 
 
  via: 
 
 
  – also archived from goecities.com transcription of 
 
 
 
 
  Transcribed in  Commentary on

Bibliography
 
 "Filioque", article in the Oxford Dictionary of the Christian Church Oxford University Press, 2005, p. 614.
 David Bradshaw.  Aristotle East and West:  Metaphysics and the Division of Christendom.  Cambridge:  Cambridge University Press, 2004, pp. 214–220.
 Joseph P. Farrell.  God, History, & Dialectic: The Theological Foundations of the Two Europes and Their Cultural Consequences. Bound edition 1997. Electronic edition 2008.
 John St. H. Gibaut, "The Cursus Honorum and the Western Case Against Photius", Logos 37 (1996), 35–73.
 Elizabeth Teresa Groppe.  Yves Congar's Theology of the Holy Spirit.  New York: Oxford University Press, 2004.  See esp. pp. 75–79, for a summary of Congar's work on theFilioque.  Congar is widely considered the most important Roman Catholic ecclesiologist of the twentieth century. He was influential in the composition of several Vatican II documents. Most important of all, he was instrumental in the association in the West of pneumatology and ecclesiology, a new development.
 David Guretzki.Karl Barth on the Filioque.Farnham, UK: Ashgate, 2009. . A close examination of Karl Barth's defense of the filioque and why his position is closer to an Eastern perspective than has typically been assumed.
 Richard Haugh.  Photius and the Carolingians:  The Trinitarian Controversy.  Belmont, MA:  Nordland Publishing Company, 1975.
 Joseph Jungmann, Pastoral Liturgy.  London: Challoner, 1962.  See "Christ our God", pp. 38–48.
 James Likoudis.  Ending the Byzantine Greek Schism.  New Rochelle, New York: 1992.  An apologetic response to polemical attacks.  A useful book for its inclusion of important texts and documents; see especially citations and works by Thomas Aquinas, O.P., Demetrios Kydones, Nikos A. Nissiotis, and Alexis Stawrowsky. The select bibliography is excellent.  The author demonstrates that the Filioque dispute is only understood as part of a dispute over papal primacy and cannot be dealt with apart from ecclesiology.
 Bruce D. Marshall, "'Ex Occidente Lux?' Aquinas and Eastern Orthodox Theology", Modern Theology 20:1 (January, 2004), 23–50. Reconsideration of the views of Aquinas, especially on deification and grace, as well as his Orthodox critics.  The author suggests that Aquinas may have a more accurate perspective than his critics, on the systematic questions of theology that relate to the Filioque dispute.
 
 
 
 Aristeides Papadakis. The Christian East and the Rise of the Papacy.  Crestwood, NY:  St. Vladimir's Seminary Press, 1994, pp. 232–238 and 379-408.
 Duncan Reid.  Energies of the Spirit:  Trinitarian Models in Eastern Orthodox and Western Theology.  Atlanta, Georgia:  Scholars Press, 1997.
 A. Edward Siecienski.  The Use of Maximus the Confessor's Writing on the Filioque at the Council of Ferrara-Florence (1438–1439).  Ann Arbor, Michigan:  UMI Dissertation Services, 2005.
 Malon H. Smith, III.  And Taking Bread: Cerularius and the Azyme Controversy of 1054.  Paris: Beauschesne, 1978.  This work is still valuable for understanding cultural and theological estrangement of East and West by the turn of the millennium.  Now, it is evident that neither side understood the other; both Greek and Latin antagonists assumed their own practices were normative and authentic.
 Timothy [Kallistos] Ware. The Orthodox Way.  Revised edition.  Crestwood, New York: 1995, pp. 89–104.

External links 
 Filioque at OrthodoxWiki
 Christian Cyclopedia entry

Filioque
6th-century Christian texts
11th-century Christianity
Christian terminology
East–West Schism
Eastern Orthodox theology
Eastern Orthodoxy-related controversies
Trinitarianism